Aviva Canada Inc. is a Canadian property and casualty insurance company and a wholly owned subsidiary of the UK-based Aviva plc. It provides home, personal, automobile, recreational vehicle, group and business insurance to more than three million customers.

History 

Aviva Canada came to fruition as a result of multiple acquisitions and rebranding, including the rebranding of Pilot Insurance Company and Scottish & York Insurance Co. Ltd.  Effective June 1, 2006 Aviva policyholders in Quebec who drive hybrid vehicles received a 10% discount.

In March 2007, Aviva Canada began to offer "hole-in-one insurance" to organizations that sponsor golf tournaments across Canada. The Hole-in-One insurance product allows tournament organizers to offer a cash (or equivalent) prize to anyone who makes a hole-in-one on one of the par 3 holes. The product is coupled with an online quoting tool that can provide a quote in less than 15 seconds for insurance limits from C$5,000 to C$50,000.

In 2008, the company announced that these companies will now operate as Aviva Pilot and Aviva Scottish & York. Other companies in the Aviva Canada group of companies include: Elite Insurance Company (also known as Aviva Elite), Traders General Insurance Company (also known as Aviva Traders) and S&Y Insurance Company. The company also has financial ownership of insurance intermediaries including Ontario Insurance Service Limited (OIS), Insurance Agent Service Inc. and Wayfarer Insurance Brokers Limited. In April 2009, Aviva Canada announced its agreement to acquire the business of National Home Warranty Group of Companies.

On 26 February 2014, the company announced that it would be relocating its headquarters to a new 12-storey office building located in Downtown Markham. The building was slated to be completed in June 2017.

In June 2013, Aviva Canada was faced with one of the costliest natural disasters in Canadian history:  "days of torrential rain inundated the city of Calgary, Alberta, and surrounding areas. The Bow and Elbow Rivers overflowed their banks, causing the evacuation of 26 neighborhoods and 100,000 people. Four died, and a state of emergency was declared in 32 communities." Insurable damages amounted to more than $1.7 billion.

On January 21, 2016, the company announced the acquisition of RBC General Insurance Company, for CAD$582 million.

Partnerships
Since 2015, Aviva Canada has been a partner of Tennis Canada and sponsor of the Rogers Cup tournament.

In 2017, Aviva Canada formed a partnership with Maple Leaf Sports & Entertainment (MLSE) to launch Toronto Raptors Insurance and Toronto Maple Leafs Insurance which covers home and auto insurance.

Products and services
Aviva Canada offers Standard Insurance products such as Vehicle Insurance and Property insurance.  Aviva insurance offer auto, home, travel, and recreational insurance, as well as commercial property, liability, and fleet insurance. Aviva is known for its excellent customer service and innovative insurance solutions, such as usage-based insurance and telematics. The company also offers Non-Standard Insurance products such as Equine/Horse Insurance, Hole-in-One, and Prize Indemnity.

Awards and recognition
 2017 - Red Cross – Partners in Humanity Award
 2018 - CPRS ACE Award – Government Relations Campaign of the Year: Aviva Fight Fraud Report
 2019 - CPRS ACE Award – Government Relations Campaign of the Year: Project Bumper
 2019 - CPRS National Award: Undistracted Driving Campaign
 2019 - IMCA Showcase Award – Media Relations Campaign of the Year: Project Bumper
 2019 - Insurance Business Canada Awards – Best Advertising Campaign of the Year: Ovation

References

External links 

Aviva Canada

Canada
Financial services companies established in 1999
Canadian subsidiaries of foreign companies
Insurance companies of Canada
Canadian companies established in 1999
1999 establishments in Ontario
Companies based in Markham, Ontario